Damir Burić (born 2 December 1980) is a Croatian water polo player who competed in the 2004 Summer Olympics and in the 2008 Summer Olympics.  At the 2012 Summer Olympics, he was part of the Croatian team that won the Olympic tournament.  He has also been World champion and European champion.

See also
 Croatia men's Olympic water polo team records and statistics
 List of Olympic champions in men's water polo
 List of Olympic medalists in water polo (men)
 List of players who have appeared in multiple men's Olympic water polo tournaments
 List of world champions in men's water polo
 List of World Aquatics Championships medalists in water polo

References

External links
 
 Olimpijac Damir Burić posjetio pulsku Gimnaziju | Regional Express
 Otvorena Sportska zona naše Škole | Gimnazija Pula
 Damir Burić otvorio caffe bar "Dvojka" u Puli
 SPORT U ISTARSKOJ ŽUPANIJI E17 "Damir Burić - razgovor" 2/4

1980 births
Living people
Sportspeople from Pula
Croatian male water polo players
Water polo centre backs
Water polo players at the 2004 Summer Olympics
Water polo players at the 2008 Summer Olympics
Water polo players at the 2012 Summer Olympics
Water polo players at the 2016 Summer Olympics
Medalists at the 2012 Summer Olympics
Medalists at the 2016 Summer Olympics
Olympic gold medalists for Croatia in water polo
Olympic silver medalists for Croatia in water polo
World Aquatics Championships medalists in water polo
Croatian expatriate sportspeople in Italy
Expatriate water polo players